Albert Kanene Obiefuna (January 30, 1930 – May 11, 2011) was the Roman Catholic archbishop of the Roman Catholic Archdiocese of Onitsha, Nigeria.

Ordained to the priesthood in 1963, Obiefuna became Bishop of Awka in 1977, Archbishop of Onitsha in 1995 and retired in 2003.

He was named Kanenechukwu by his parents because of the trying circumstances associated with his birth.

References

1930 births
2011 deaths
Nigerian Roman Catholics
Roman Catholic archbishops of Onitsha
Roman Catholic bishops of Awka